Ban Du is a tambon (sub-district) of Mueang Chiang Rai District, in Chiang Rai Province, Thailand. In 2005 it had a population of 14,542 people. The tambon has 19 villages. One of those villages also has the name Ban Du.

References

Tambon of Chiang Rai province
Populated places in Chiang Rai province